Khobragade is an Indian surname that may refer to
Dadaji Ramaji Khobragade, an Indian cultivator who invented a high-yielding variety of paddy, HMT.
B.D. Khobragade (1925–1984), Indian lawyer and politician
Devyani Khobragade, Indian Foreign Service officer
Devyani Khobragade incident in 2013 related to a visa fraud
Uttam Khobragade, Indian Administrative Service officer, father of Devyani